Lovers is a 1999 French drama film directed by Jean-Marc Barr. It was the fifth film and the first non-Danish film to be made under the self-imposed rules of the Dogme 95 manifesto.

Plot
Jeanne and Dragan meet in a Paris bookshop - she's working there, he's looking for a book on the English painter Dante Gabriel Rossetti. The two strike up a passionate affair, but Dragan doesn't tell her that he is in the country illegally.

Cast
 Élodie Bouchez as Jeanne
 Sergej Trifunović as Dragan
 Dragan Nikolic as Zlatan
 Geneviève Page as Alice
 Thibault de Montalembert as Jean-Michel
 Philippe Duquesne as The client

References

External links
 

French drama films
1990s French films

Dogme 95 films